Carex simulans is a tussock-forming species of perennial sedge in the family Cyperaceae. It is native to southern parts of China.

See also
List of Carex species

References

simulans
Plants described in 1904
Taxa named by Charles Baron Clarke
Flora of China